Antigone is a genus of large birds in the crane family. The species in this genus were formerly placed in the genus Grus.

Taxonomy
A molecular phylogenetic study published in 2010 found that the genus Grus was polyphyletic. In the subsequent rearrangement, four species were placed in the resurrected genus Antigone. The genus had initially been erected in 1853 by German naturalist Ludwig Reichenbach. The type species is the sarus crane (Antigone antigone).

Species
The genus includes four species:

References

 
Bird genera
Taxa named by Ludwig Reichenbach